Aleksa Šantić is a village located in the Sombor municipality, in the West Bačka District of Serbia. It is situated in the Autonomous Province of Vojvodina. The population of the village numbering 2,172 people (2002 census) and most of its inhabitants are ethnic Serbs.

Name

The village is named (in 1924) after Aleksa Šantić, a Serb poet from Bosnia and Herzegovina. In Serbo-Croatian, the village is known as Aleksa Šantić (Алекса Шантић), and in Hungarian as Babapuszta, Sári, or Hadikkisfalu.

History

In 1468, a settlement named Sáripuszta  was mentioned at this location. The present-day village was founded between 1923 and 1926 and was settled by Serb volunteers from World War I. During the Hungarian Axis occupation in World War II, the name of the village was changed to Fernbach.

Historical population

1961: 1,751
1971: 2,064
1981: 2,259
1991: 2,267
2002: 2,172
2011: 1,778

See also
List of places in Serbia
List of cities, towns and villages in Vojvodina

References
Slobodan Ćurčić, Broj stanovnika Vojvodine, Novi Sad, 1996.

External links
 Aleksa Šantić - www.soinfo.org

Sombor
Places in Bačka
West Bačka District